Lubuk China is a small town in Alor Gajah District, Malacca, Malaysia, situated near the border with Negeri Sembilan.

Tourist attractions
 The Orchard Wellness and Health Resort

See also
 List of cities and towns in Malaysia by population

References

Towns in Malacca